Furlonge is an English or Irish surname. It is related to the surname Furlong, and both are derived from Old English roots meaning "length of a furrow".

Prevalence
It is most prevalent in Trinidad and Tobago and England. The highest density is reached in Montserrat.

Notable people
Notable people with this surname include:
 Carl Furlonge (1932-2015), Trinidadian cricketer
 Hammond Furlonge (born 1934), West Indian cricketer
 Kenneth Furlonge (born 1937), Trinidadian cricketer

See also
 Furlong (disambiguation)

References